The 1947–48 Klass B season was the first season of the Klass B, the second level of ice hockey in the Soviet Union. Fifteen teams participated in the league, and Dzerzchinez Chelyabinsk won the championship and was promoted to the Soviet Championship League.

First round

Central Zone

Eastern Zone

Final tournament

External links
 Season on hockeyarchives.info

2
Soviet Union
Ice hockey leagues in the Soviet Union